Carlo Sonego (born 20 February 1972) is a retired javelin thrower from Italy.

Biography
He won two national titles (1994 and 1999) during his career. He set his personal best (84.60 metres) on 8 May 1999 in Osaka, Japan. Born in Sacile, he is son of Gianfranco Sonego and is the nephew of Renato Sonego owner of Sonego Sport cycling team.

National records
 Javelin throw: 84.60 m ( Osaka, 8 May 1999) – current holder

Progression
He finished the season 1999 in world top 25 (at 16th).

Achievements

National titles
Carlo Sonego has won 3 times for the individual national championships.
2 wins in javelin throw (1994, 1999)
1 win in javelin throw (1999) at the Italian Winter Throwing Championships

See also
 Italian records in athletics
 Italian all-time lists – Javelin throw
 Men's javelin throw Italian record progression

References

External links
 
 Carlo Sonego interview 4 October 2013  

1972 births
Living people
Italian male javelin throwers
Athletics competitors of Fiamme Gialle